An air compressor is a pneumatic device that converts power (using an electric motor, diesel or gasoline engine, etc.) into potential energy stored in pressurized air (i.e., compressed air). By one of several methods, an air compressor forces more and more air into a storage tank, increasing the pressure. When the tank's pressure reaches its engineered upper limit, the air compressor shuts off. The compressed air, then, is held in the tank until called into use.  The kinetic energy provided by  the compressed air can be used for a variety of applications such as pneumatic tool as it is released air and the tank depressurizes. When tank pressure reaches its lower limit, the air compressor turns on again and re-pressurizes the tank.
An air compressor must be differentiated from a pump because it works for any gas/air, while pumps work on a liquid.

Classification

Compressors may be classified according to the pressure delivered:
 Medium-pressure compressors which have a discharge pressure of 
 High-pressure air compressors (HPACs), which have a discharge pressure above

Positive displacement compressors

Positive-displacement compressors work by forcing air in a chamber whose volume is decreased to compress the air. Once the maximum pressure is reached, a port or valve opens and air is discharged into the outlet system from the compression chamber. Common types of positive displacement compressors are

 Piston-type: air compressors use this principle by pumping air into an air chamber through the use of the constant motion of pistons. They use one-way valves to guide air into and out of a chamber whose base consists of a moving piston.  When the piston is on its down stroke, it draws air into the chamber.  When it is on its up stroke, the charge of air is forced out and into a storage tank. Piston compressors generally fall into two basic categories, single-stage and two-stage.  Single stage compressors usually fall into the fractional through 5 horsepower range. Two-stage compressors normally fall into the 5 through 30 horsepower range.  Two-stage compressors provide greater efficiency than their single-stage counterparts. For this reason, these compressors are the most common units within the small business community.  The capacities for both single-stage and two-stage compressors is generally provided in horsepower (HP), Standard Cubic feet per Minute (SCFM)* and Pounds per Square Inch (PSI).   *To a lesser extent, some compressors are rated in Actual Cubic Feet per Minute (ACFM).  Still others are rated in Cubic Feet per Minute (CFM). Using CFM to rate a compressor is incorrect because it represents a flow rate that is independent of a pressure reference.  i.e. 20 CFM at 60 PSI. 
 Rotary screw compressors: use positive-displacement compression by matching two helical screws that, when turned, guide air into a chamber, whose volume is decreased as the screws turn. Rotary screw compressors can be single-stage or two-stage
 Vane compressors: use a slotted rotor with varied blade placement to guide air into a chamber and compress the volume. This type of compressor delivers a fixed volume of air at high pressures.

Roto-dynamic or turbo compressors 

Roto-dynamic air compressors include centrifugal compressors and axial compressors. Rotating vanes impart kinetic energy to a gas and stationary passages convert velocity into a rise in pressure.

Cooling 
Due to adiabatic heating, air compressors require some method of disposing of waste heat.  Generally this is some form of air- or water-cooling, although some (particularly rotary type) compressors may be cooled by oil (that is then in turn air- or water-cooled). The atmospheric changes are also considered during cooling of compressors. The type of cooling is determined by considering the factors such as inlet temperature, ambient temperature, power of the compressor and area of application. There is no single type of compressor that could be used for any application.

Applications 

Air compressors have many uses, including: supplying high-pressure clean air to fill gas cylinders, supplying moderate-pressure clean air to a submerged surface supplied diver, supplying moderate-pressure clean air for driving some office and school building pneumatic HVAC control system valves, supplying a large amount of moderate-pressure air to power pneumatic tools, such as jackhammers, filling high pressure air tanks (HPA, air tank), for filling tires, and to produce large volumes of moderate-pressure air for large-scale industrial processes (such as oxidation for petroleum coking or cement plant bag house purge systems).

Air compressors are also widely used in oil and gas, mining and drilling applications as the flushing medium, aerating muds in underbalanced drilling and in air pigging of pipelines.

Most air compressors either are reciprocating piston type, rotary vane or rotary screw. Centrifugal compressors are common in very large applications, while rotary screw, scroll, and reciprocating air compressors are favored for small and medium-sized applications.

Driver options 
Air compressors are designed to utilize a variety of power sources. While gas/diesel-powered and electric air compressors are among the most popular, air compressors that utilize vehicle engines, power-take-off, or hydraulic ports are also commonly used in mobile applications.

The power of a compressor is measured in HP (horsepower) and CFM (cubic feet per minute of intake air).
The gallon size of the tank specifies the volume of compressed air (in reserve) available. Gas/diesel powered compressors are widely used in remote areas with problematic access to electricity. They are noisy and require ventilation for exhaust gases. Electric powered compressors are widely used in production, workshops and garages with permanent access to electricity. Common workshop/garage compressors are 110-120 Volt or 230-240 Volt. Compressor tank shapes are: "pancake", "twin tank", "horizontal", and "vertical". Depending on a size and purpose compressors can be stationary or portable.

Maintenance 

To ensure all compressor types run efficiently with no leaks, it is imperative to perform routine maintenance, such as monitoring and replacing air fuel management components and lubricant maintenance as well as draining water from the tank and replacing seals. Most air compressors can be operated by following the instructions from the included manual. It is suggested that air compressor owners perform daily inspections of their equipment, such as:
 Checking for oil and air leaks
 Checking the differential pressure in the compressed air filter
 Determining whether or not the oil in the compressor should be changed
 Verifying safe operating temperature
 Draining condensation from air receiver tanks

Air compressor isentropic efficiency
According to CAGI air compressor performance verification data sheets, the higher the isentropic efficiency is, the better the energy saving is. The better air compressor isentropic efficiency has reached 95%.

Approximately 70~80% of the air compressor total life time cost is energy consumption, so using the high efficiency air compressor is one of energy saving methods.

See also
 Vacuum pump
 Free-piston engine
 Gas compressor
 Pneumatics
 Gas cylinder

External links
CAGI Isentropic Efficiency

References

Gas compressors
Gases
Diving support equipment
Gas technologies
Industrial gases